Fye or FYE may refer to:
 Fyé, a commune in Pays-de-la-Loire, France
 FYE (retailer) ("For Your Entertainment"), American media retailer
 Fayette County Airport (Tennessee), FAA LID of FYE
 The First Year Experience Program
 Fiscal year end